The Canadiens–Maple Leafs rivalry is an ice hockey rivalry between the Montreal Canadiens and Toronto Maple Leafs, two professional ice hockey clubs in the National Hockey League (NHL). The Canadiens and Maple Leafs are the league's oldest teams, with the former established in 1909 and the latter in 1917. Both clubs compete in the Atlantic Division of the NHL's Eastern Conference. 

The rivalry between the two teams picked up after the Montreal Maroons folded in 1938, resulting in the Canadiens and Maple Leafs being the only Canadian-based teams in the NHL until 1970. Both teams saw success during the Original Six era, with the Stanley Cup having been primarily awarded to either the Canadiens or Maple Leafs during that period. In addition to the on-ice play the rivalry was exacerbated by societal issues in mid-20th century Canada, with the two teams serving as stand-ins for a variety of cultural dualities in Canadian society; most notably with the Canadiens representing French-speaking Canada, and the Maple Leafs the English-speaking part of the country. The rivalry's association with larger societal issues in the country has left an imprint on Canadian culture, most notably through the publication of the short story, The Hockey Sweater by Roch Carrier.

The Canadiens and Maple Leafs have met in 16 Stanley Cup playoff series, including five Stanley Cup Finals. The rivalry between the two teams has waned since the Original Six era, with the Canadiens and Maple Leafs having played in separate conferences of the NHL from 1981 to 1998; and having not met in the playoffs from 1980 to 2020. Although the rivalry is no longer influenced by its historical associations, it remains symbolic of the relationship between the country's two largest cities, Toronto and Montreal.

Background
The rivalry between Montreal and Toronto predates the foundation of either hockey club, with the two cities having been considered economic rivals since the mid-19th century, as well as cultural rivals from the mid-20th century. Toronto emerged as an economic rival to Montreal during the 1850s. Although Montreal remained the Province of Canada's largest city throughout that period, Toronto's population also began to grow significantly. In addition to being economic rivals, Montreal and Toronto's early identities were rooted in the cultural differences between the two cities. From its foundation, Montreal was historically viewed as Canada's cosmopolitan centre for culture; which contrasted Toronto's pre-World War era reputation as a small city and bastion for "Victorian morality". Following Canadian Confederation, the two cities had become obvious rivals for cultural and financial control of the "Canadian hinterland". 

After the Second World War, Toronto began to eclipse Montreal as the "cultural gateway" to Canada for Americans; making it a potential cultural rival to Montreal. For the most part however, Toronto continued to be viewed as a provincial industrial city, subservient to Montreal in culture and finance until the 1960s. The financial situation would reverse by 1971, with Toronto having eclipsed Montreal as the financial capital of the country; and the population of the Greater Toronto Area overtaking Greater Montreal shortly afterwards.

Sports
The rivalry between the two cities eventually extended into sports, with rival national athletic sports bodies, the Toronto-based Canadian Amateur Athletic Union, and the Montreal-based Amateur Athletic Federation of Canada, fighting for control over amateur sports in the country during the early 20th century. 

A dispute between Eddie Livingstone, the owner of the National Hockey Association's Toronto Blueshirts, and the other owners of the NHA, including the Montreal Canadiens owner George Kennedy led to the creation of the National Hockey League in 1917. Because the NHA's constitution prevented the disgruntled owners from expelling Livingstone, they opted to instead form a new professional hockey league; and voted to suspend NHA operations for the year. The resulting dispute led to the creation of the modern NHL, as well as the present hockey club in Toronto; with the new NHL owners opting to establish a hockey club in Toronto in an effort to maintain a four team circuit that included the Canadiens, Montreal Wanderers, and Ottawa Senators. A temporary franchise was awarded to the Arena Gardens of Toronto Ltd., which was later made permanent in October 1918.

History
During the NHL's first 25 seasons, Montreal and Toronto had played in only two playoff series, during the 1918 NHL Championship, and the 1925 NHL Championship. The 1918 series saw Toronto win the first game of the series 7–3, and the Canadiens winning the second game of the series 4–3; with Canadiens' Harry Meeking scoring a hat trick during that game. Toronto advanced to win the 1918 Stanley Cup Finals, as the two-game NHL Championship series was determined by total goals scored.

The Canadiens won the second playoff series played between the two clubs, with the Canadiens outscoring the St. Patricks 5–2. Both series consist of two games, where the winner was determined by the total goals scored. The champions from both NHL Championship series advanced to the Stanley Cup Finals; which until 1926, operated as a championship series between top-tier professional hockey leagues in North America.

After the Montreal Maroons folded in 1938, the Canadiens and Maple Leafs remained the league's only remaining Canadian teams from 1938 to 1970; enabling both teams to accrue a number of fans across Canada as the only two NHL teams in the country.

Original Six era (1942–1967)
The two teams played in 11 postseason series between 1944 to 1967. The rivalry between the two teams picked up in 1946, when assistant manager Frank J. Selke left the Maple Leafs to become the general manager of the Canadiens; having left the Maple Leafs organization partly due to ongoing tensions between himself and their managing director, Conn Smythe. 

The rivalry perhaps reached its zenith in the 1967 Stanley Cup Finals during the centennial year of Canadian Confederation, and the year Montreal was hosting Expo 67. An exhibit space had been prepared for the Stanley Cup at the expo's Quebec pavilion, as the heavily-favored Canadiens were supposed to beat the Leafs quite handily. However, underdog Toronto upset the Canadiens to capture their most recent Cup; with the team opting to exhibit the Stanley Cup at the expo's Ontario pavilion instead.

Expansion and modern era (1967–present)
The last two postseason series played between the two teams in the 20th century occurred during the 1978 and 1979 Stanley Cup playoffs, with the Canadiens sweeping the Maple Leafs both times.

The fortunes of the two teams since 1967 have also seen a marked difference; the Canadiens have won 10 Stanley Cup championships since that year, while the Maple Leafs have yet to reach the Stanley Cup Finals. However, they were narrowly defeated in the Campbell Conference Finals by the Los Angeles Kings. At the 1994 NHL All-Star Game in New York City the following January, however, the then-starting goaltenders of the two teams—Montreal's Patrick Roy and Toronto's Felix Potvin — were the starting goalies, Potvin substituting for future Maple Leafs goaltender Ed Belfour. The Eastern Conference, coached by the Canadiens' Jacques Demers, won the game, 9–8.

On May 29, 1992, Pat Burns resigned as the Canadiens head coach and was hired as the Maple Leafs head coach that same day, adding more fuel to the fire. Burns coached the Canadiens to the 1989 Stanley Cup Finals, but lost to the Calgary Flames in six games.

In , the Leafs moved into the Eastern Conference's Northeast Division. This has served to rekindle the rivalry, although the two teams did not appear in a playoff series against each other until 2021. For the Maple Leafs, this realignment also put them in the same division as the Ottawa Senators, their in-province rivals.

21st century

In the first decade of the 2000s, the two teams have eliminated the other from Stanley Cup playoffs contention on occasion; with the Canadiens eliminating the Maple Leafs from the playoffs during the 2005–06 season. In the 2006–07 season, both teams played their final game of that season against one another, with the two teams required to win in order to remain qualified for the 2007 Stanley Cup playoffs. The Maple Leafs won the game 6–5, eliminating the Canadiens from playoff contention; although the Maple Leafs were eliminated the following day after the New York Islanders beat the New Jersey Devils.  

Another realignment in  kept the Canadiens, Maple Leafs, and Senators in the same division, now going by the Atlantic Division name (the old Atlantic Division was renamed the Metropolitan Division). In 2014, an attempted trade between the Canadiens and Maple Leafs was blocked after Canadiens defenceman Josh Gorges refused to waive Toronto from his "no-trade list". When asked about his refusal to waive, Gorges commented that he "couldn’t be the same player that [he] was in Montreal in Toronto," as he could not play with "that same passion and heart for a team that, for eight years, was your most talked about rival".

On October 14, 2017, the Maple Leafs beat the Canadiens 4–3 in overtime, ending a record-breaking 14-game losing streak against their rivals dating back over three years to January 18, 2014. It was also their first win in Montreal in over four years, stretching back to October 1, 2013. This marked the first of seven straight wins against the Canadiens for the Maple Leafs, a streak broken when the Canadiens won 6–5 in a shootout, the final game of the 2018–19 season. 

The Canadiens then won the first three matchups of the 2019–20 season before the season was cut short by the COVID-19 pandemic.

For the shortened  season, the two teams played each other 10 times in the North Division as the NHL temporarily realigned the divisions due to the COVID-19 pandemic, the most meetings between the teams since the 1967–68 NHL season. The Maple Leafs won the season series 7–2–1, including wins over the Canadiens on April 28 to clinch a playoff berth and May 8 to clinch the North Division title. The Canadiens finished fourth in the division, setting up the teams' first playoff meeting since 1979. The two teams met in the first round, where Game 2 became Toronto's first postseason victory over Montreal since Game 6 of the 1967 Stanley Cup Finals. Following a dominant 4–0 win in game 4 the Leafs led the series 3–1, but suffered two subsequent overtime losses in games 5 and 6. The Canadiens ultimately won the best-of-seven matchup 4–3 with a 3–1 win in game 7, advancing to the second playoff round.

Cultural impact
From the early to mid-20th century, professional ice hockey was viewed as one of the few "battlefields" where French Canadians could excel against English-speaking Canadians. Because of this, the Montreal Canadiens had developed rivalries with several hockey clubs, in which the teams were linked to larger class, linguistic, and religious divisions in the country. Prior to the Original Six era, the Canadiens had developed rivalries with the Montreal Wanderers (1903–1918), and the Montreal Maroons (1924–1938); with francophone hockey fans in Montreal supporting the Canadiens, and anglophone hockey fans in Montreal supporting the latter two teams prior to them folding. 

During the Original Six-era, the rivalry between the Canadiens and the Toronto Maple Leafs found itself linked to these societal issues, with the two teams representing a myriad of Canadian societal dualities. The rivalry has been called a "microcosm of Canadian society," given the two teams' association with the two solitudes of Canada. However, the rivalry between the two hockey clubs became less associated with these cultural dualities after the Quiet Revolution in the 1960s and 1970s; mirroring the rise of a more equitable society in Quebec, and as the economic situation improved for francophones. After decades of net interprovincial migration from the Montreal to Toronto areas, Canadiens fans became more visible in Toronto territory. A Toronto sports bar, Kilgour's, was known for many patrons supporting the Canadiens.

The fanbases of both teams began to erode somewhat following the Original Six era, with five other Canadian teams added into the league; with new teams formed in Vancouver (the Canucks), Calgary (the Flames), Edmonton (the Oilers), Winnipeg (the Jets), and Ottawa (the Senators). Another club in Quebec City (the Nordiques) also competed in the NHL from 1979 to 1995. Meanwhile, after NHL expansion into the U.S., the rivalry was sometimes softened by the phenomenon of many Canadians cheering for any Canadian team in a good position to "bring the Cup home" to Canada.

In popular culture

The Canadiens-Maple Leafs rivalry is central to the children's book The Hockey Sweater, in which the protagonist, a Canadiens fan presumably based on author Roch Carrier as a child, is forced to wear a Leafs sweater. In 1980, the story was adapted into an animated short, The Sweater, by the National Film Board of Canada. 

The rivalry is also featured in the murals of Toronto's College subway station, in a work by Charles Pachter called Hockey Knights in Canada. The two murals are installed appropriately in opposition, with one facing the other across the subway tracks. The mural of the Montreal Canadiens is on the northbound side of the station, while another mural of the Maple Leafs stands directly across from it on southbound side of the station. College station is the closest station to Maple Leaf Gardens, the Maple Leafs home arena from 1931 to 1999.

Playoff results
The Canadiens and Maple Leafs have met in the playoffs 16 times. To date, Montreal has won nine playoff series while Toronto has won seven. Scores of games won by the series winning team are in bold.

See also
 Canadian Classique
 National Hockey League rivalries
 Pearson Cup

Notes

References

Bibliography
 
 
 
 
 
 
 

History of the Montreal Canadiens
History of the Toronto Maple Leafs
National Hockey League rivalries